LAPC may refer to:
Los Angeles Pierce College, a community college that serves more than 23,000 students in the northern Chalk Hills of Woodland Hills, a community within the San Fernando Valley region of the city of Los Angeles, California.
Lesbians Against Pit Closures, an alliance of openly lesbian women who came together to support the National Union of Mineworkers and various mining communities during the UK miners' strike.

See also
Roland LAPC-I a sound card for PCs